Zal (also Romanized as Zāl) is a village in Harzandat-e Gharbi Rural District, in the Central District of Marand County, East Azerbaijan Province, Iran. At the 2006 census, its population was 453, in 138 families.

References 

Populated places in Marand County